Ctenucha tapajoza is a moth of the family Erebidae. It is found in the Amazon region.

References

tapajoza
Moths described in 1923